The 1997 Notre Dame Fighting Irish football team represented the University of Notre Dame in the 1997 NCAA Division I-A football season. The team was coached by Bob Davie and played its home games at Notre Dame Stadium in South Bend, Indiana.

Season overview
Despite having a new coach, the Irish had high expectations before the 1997 season, and were ranked eleventh in the pre-season polls. Led by fifth–year senior quarterback Ron Powlus, a running back crew of Autry Denson, Tony Driver, and Joey Goodspeed, a wide receiving corps of Joey Getherall, Bobby Brown, and Malcolm Johnson, and on defense by cornerback Allen Rossum, the Irish looked to have a good enough team to challenge to be in the top-10. The Irish began the Davie era at home, playing Georgia Tech in the newly renovated Notre Dame Stadium. The Irish christened the stadium with a close win over the Yellow Jackets that was sparked by a renewed running game and key defensive stops late in the game. With the close win, the Irish showed their weakness and dropped a spot in the national ranking. The next week, at Purdue, though the Irish had 457 total yards, they only managed 17 points. With key mistakes on offense and a confused defense, the Irish lost 28–17 and dropped out of the rankings. With losses against Michigan State, at Michigan, and at Stanford, the Irish were suddenly 1–4 and struggling to find an offense. Offensive coordinator, Jim Colletto, took most of the flak for the struggles.

The Irish looked to be getting back on track with a trip to face Pittsburgh. With a renewed running game, the Irish beat the struggling Panthers by 24, however, with the offense struggling once again in their next game, a loss to rival University of Southern California (USC), the Irish hit, what was called, "rock bottom." With a slight quarterback controversy, the Irish next faced Boston College. Though backup quarterback Jarious Jackson played 21 downs, Powlus led the Irish with 267 passing yards to rout the Eagles and put the Irish offense back on track. With a last minute win over Navy the next week, the Irish moved to 4–5 and would need to win their final three games to become bowl eligible.

The Irish next went to Louisiana State University (LSU) to face the 11th ranked Tigers. Looked to be outmatched, the Irish didn't commit a penalty all game, had no turnovers, and didn't give up any plays longer than one 28 yard pass, to upset the Tigers and move back to 5–5 on the season. The Irish then faced 22nd ranked West Virginia for their final home game. With the game tied late in the fourth quarter, Powlus led the Irish on a drive that was capped by his final touchdown pass at Notre Dame Stadium for the game-winning touchdown. With the win the Irish beat ranked opponents on consecutive Saturdays for the first time since 1992, and with the last minute win at Hawaii the next week, the Irish moved to 7–5 and were bowl eligible. Once again facing LSU in Louisiana (in the Independence Bowl), this time with the Tigers ranked 15th, LSU dominated on offense and beat the Irish 27–9. Though the Irish finished with a loss, the 7–6 record was the biggest Irish turn around in team history.

By the end of the season, Powlus set a single season Irish record for pass attempts and completions. He would leave Notre Dame with 20 individual records, including career passing yards, attempts, completions and touchdowns, all marks that would finally be eclipsed almost ten years later by future Irish quarterback Brady Quinn. Cornerback Allen Rossum, who also served as the Irish kick returner, set an NCAA single season record with nine returns (three each of interceptions, punts, and kickoffs) for touchdowns. He would also leave Notre Dame with the Irish all-time leading kick return average (23.5 yards per return). Autry Denson's 1268 rushing yards were fourth in the Irish single season record and moved him to third on the Irish all-time list in career rushing yards.

Schedule

Roster

Game summaries

Navy

Allen Rossum knocked Pat McGrew out at the two-yard line on a Hail Mary pass to preserve Notre Dame's 34th straight win over Navy

References

Notre Dame
Notre Dame Fighting Irish football seasons
Notre Dame Fighting Irish football